Bargeddie was a railway station in the village of Bargeddie, North Lanarkshire, Scotland. It was opened as Cuilhill, by the North British Railway on 1 February 1871. It was renamed Bargeddie on 1 April 1904.

The station closed to passengers on 24 September 1927.

References

Notes

Sources
 
 
 

Disused railway stations in Glasgow
Railway stations in Great Britain opened in 1871
Railway stations in Great Britain closed in 1917
Railway stations in Great Britain opened in 1919
Railway stations in Great Britain closed in 1927
Former North British Railway stations